Karepalli is a city in the  Khammam district in Telangana, India where the railway track from Singareni collieries meets the Manuguru-Dornakal railway line. Karepalli is the Mandal headquarters of Singareni Mandal. It comes under the Wyra Assembly Constituency. Another name for Karepalli is Singareni.

Education

Primary & Secondary
Karepalli has two primary schools, one at the centre of the town with an enrollment of 50 students, and the other at Bheekya Thanda. There are also five primary schools in the Gate Kareplally region. It has a Mandal Parishad Upper primary school with an enrollment of 209 students.  There is also a Zilla Parishad High School with an enrollment of 239 students. 

There are two Intermediate Colleges in Karepalli for +2 studies:  
Govt Junior College (Est 1983)
Vignan Junior College (est 2007)

Primary and High Schools:

Vidwan High School Telugu Medium
Top Range Digital School 
Vidwan Digi English Medium School
Z.P. High School
U.P. School-Montessori English Medium School
Nirmala English Medium School
Little Stars Primary EM School
Telangana Model School & College

Higher
Junior Colleges
 Telangana Model Jr. College

 GOVT Jr .College
 Vignan Jr. College
Degree Colleges
 Vignan Degree College
 Nirmal Hridai Degree College
 Vikas Degree College
Polytechnic Colleges
 Sre Kavitha Polytechnic College

Engineering Colleges
Sree Raja Rajeshwari Engineering College
Sree Kavitha Engineering College

MBA& MCA
 Sree Kavitha MBA & MCA College
 S.r.r. MBA & MCA College
 
 The karepally railway station is also one of the oldest railway station in the Telangana region. This station was built by the British government.

Transport

Train
The Karepalli railway station is also one of the oldest railway station in the Telangana region. The station was built by the British government. The train route which was originally laid for the coal from Singareni gets divided at Karepalli, as one route goes to Yellandu for coal stock while the other route transports the coal to the Kothagudem thermal power plant.

The train route is also used by passengers for travel to Hyderabad and Vijayawada via Dornakal.

Road
It is connected to Yellandu and Khammam by road. TSRTC operates regular buses to Karepalli. There are also a large number of private autos that commute passengers.

References

Khammam district